Nickelodeon SlimeFest is an annual music and entertainment festival organized by the American children's network Nickelodeon. Originally held in Australia, other SlimeFest festivals were then held in various parts of the world, including the United States, which held its most recent edition in June 2019.

The event was set to return to the United States on 21–22 March 2020 at The Forum as a tie-in with the 2020 Kids' Choice Awards, however, the event was cancelled as a result of local health concerns about the international coronavirus pandemic.

Hosts and Cities

SlimeFest Performances

SlimeFest 2012
SlimeFest 2012 included performances by and appearances by:

Performers
Jessica Mauboy
Johnny Ruffo
Reece Mastin
Stan Walker
Christina Parie

Appearances
Steve "The Commando" Willis
Richard Wilkins
Charlotte Dawson
Brian McFadden

SlimeFest 2013
SlimeFest 2013 included performances by and appearances by:

Performers
Big Time Rush
Guy Sebastian
Samantha Jade
Justice Crew
Heffron Drive
Jadagrace

Appearances
Steve "The Commando" Willis
Reece Mastin
Rhiannon Fish
Mike Goldman
Luke Jacobz
Sam Moran
Chris Sebastian

SlimeFest 2014
SlimeFest 2014 included performances by and appearances by:

Performers
Cody Simpson
Sabrina Carpenter
The Collective
Savage
Alli Simpson
Justice Crew
Ricki-Lee (Sydney)
Dami Im (Melbourne)
Timomatic (Cancelled)

Appearances
The Voice Kids

SlimeFest 2015
SlimeFest 2015 included performances by and appearances by:

Performers
Boyce Avenue
The Veronicas
Samantha Jade
At Sunset
Reece Mastin
Timmy Trumpet
Savage

Appearances
Cosentino

SlimeFest 2016
SlimeFest 2016 included performances by:

Performers
Delta Goodrem
Omi
Havana Brown
G.R.L.
In Stereo
Mashd N Kutcher
Megan Nicole
Kian & JC (Cancelled)

SlimeFest U.S. 2018
SlimeFest U.S. 2018 included performances by and appearances by:

Performers
Zedd
Liam Payne
Flo Rida
JoJo Siwa

Appearances
Ella Anderson
Riele Downs
Benjamin Flores Jr.
Kel Mitchell
Owen Joyner
Daniella Perkins
Breanna Yde

SlimeFest U.S. 2019
SlimeFest U.S. 2019 included performances by and appearances by:

Performers
Pitbull
Bebe Rexha
JoJo Siwa
T-Pain

Appearances
Annie LeBlanc
Scarlett Spencer
Dallas Dupree Young
Ella Anderson
Riele Downs
Owen Joyner
Daniella Perkins

SlimeFest U.S. 2020
SlimeFest U.S. 2020 was cancelled on 3 April 2020 due to the COVID-19 pandemic. This is what would have been the lineup:

Performers
JoJo Siwa
Why Don't We
French Montana
Blanco Brown
Darci Lynne

Appearances
Ryan Alessi
Aria Brooks
Reece Caddell
Kate Godfrey
Gabrielle Nevaeh Green
Nathan Janak
Lex Lumpkin
Chinguun Sergelen
Cooper Barnes
Sean Ryan Fox
Michael D. Cohen
Young Dylan

International
Following on from the success of Nickelodeon SlimeFest in Australia, the music festival has since been exported to several other countries with local performers and artists. SlimeFest events have taken place in Spain, Italy and the UK (September 2016). Nickelodeon announces its first Slimefest in Asia in August 2019. It was held at the Mall of Asia Concert Grounds in the Philippines on 28 September 2019.

References

External links 
 

Music festivals in Australia
Festivals in Sydney
Slimefest